Alex Wood (1871 – May 1937) was an Anglican bishop in India from 1919 to 1937.

He was born in 1871, educated at Aberdeen University and Edinburgh Theological College and ordained in 1895. His first post was a curacy at St John's Forfar. He was at the Scottish Episcopalian Mission at Chanda from 1898 to 1919,  a period of service interrupted by World War I service as a temporary Chaplain to the Forces. In 1919 he became Bishop of Chota Nagpur and in 1926 was translated to Nagpur. He died in post on May 1937, his predecessor writing his biography.

References

1871 births
1937 deaths
Alumni of the University of Aberdeen
Officers of the Order of the British Empire
20th-century Anglican bishops in India
Anglican bishops of Chota Nagpur
Anglican bishops of Nagpur
World War I chaplains
Alumni of Edinburgh Theological College
Royal Army Chaplains' Department officers